HMS Triumph was a broadside ironclad battleship of the Victorian era, the sister-ship of . These two ships comprise the Swiftsure class of 1870.

The two sister-ships, which were built side by side by Palmers, were designed and built specifically to serve as flagships on distant stations, primarily with the Pacific squadron. They were powered by a Maudslay horizontal twin-cylinder return connecting-rod engine, and were the last British battleships to be fitted with a hoisting screw.

Construction
The ship was built by Palmers Shipbuilding and Iron Company, Jarrow, Northumberland. She was launched on 27 September 1870. On 28 November, during fitting out, she was severely damaged by fire. As a result, she was not completed until 8 April 1873.

Service history
Triumph was initially commissioned in 1873 for the Channel Fleet, being transferred after a short time to the Mediterranean. On 1 March 1877, she collided with the steamship  but was not damaged. She paid off in 1877 to be prepared for transfer to the Pacific as flagship, replacing  after her indecisive action against the Peruvian rebel ship Huascar.

On 21 November 1881, while Triumph was off Chile, an explosion occurred caused by a drying compound called "xerotine siccative", also called a patent drier. Three men were killed and seven were wounded.
She was relieved by Swiftsure in 1882.

Triumph returned to Portsmouth, where she was refitted, receiving new boilers and launching rails for torpedoes. She served as Pacific flagship from January 1885 until December 1888, and was present at the official opening of the Canadian Pacific Railway in Vancouver harbour in 1887 for both ceremonial reasons and protection against a rumoured Fenian attack.  Her relief at that time by Swiftsure signalled the end of her foreign service.

Returning home, she was for a short time in reserve at Devonport, and was then flagship at Queenstown between February 1890 and September 1892. She returned to the reserve at Devonport, where she remained until July 1900. She was disarmed to become a depot ship at Plymouth. Captain Arthur William Edward Prothero was appointed in command on 11 July 1902, for command of Fleet Reserve at Devonport, but the appointment was cancelled and Captain Cecil Thursby was appointed in command from 16 July 1902. In September that year it was announced that her engines and boilers would be removed, and the vessel converted into a hulk. In 1903, with her machinery removed, she was a training ship for boy artificers at Chatham under the new name of Tenedos. She was towed to Invergordon in 1914 to become a floating store with the name of Algiers. She was sold in November 1921, having remained afloat thirteen years longer than her sister.

Notes

References

Bibliography

External links

 

Swiftsure-class ironclads
Ships built on the River Tyne
1870 ships
Victorian-era battleships of the United Kingdom
Maritime incidents in November 1870